Beihe is a township of Xingtang County, Hebei, China, located in the eastern foothills of the Taihang Mountains  north-northwest of the county seat. , it had 9 villages under its administration.

See also
List of township-level divisions of Hebei

References

Township-level divisions of Hebei